Mir Ali Khan Talpur (born 29 October 1988) is a Pakistani first-class cricketer who plays for Hyderabad. In the 2011–12 Quaid-e-Azam Trophy, he took a hat-trick.

References

External links
 

1988 births
Living people
Pakistani cricketers
Hyderabad (Pakistan) cricketers
Cricketers from Hyderabad, Sindh